The England men's national lacrosse team is one of the premier national teams in Europe and the world having competed at every World Lacrosse Championship since its inception in 1967 and having won all but one of the European Lacrosse Championships. Currently the team is ranked 5th in the world. The team is governed by  England Lacrosse which has been a full member of World Lacrosse since 1972.

History
The England men's national team has played in every World Lacrosse Championship since 1967, earning a silver medal in 1974. The last world championship to be held in England was the 2010 World Lacrosse Championship, in Manchester, England, where they placed 5th. The men's team has competed in the European Lacrosse Championship since 1995 and has won nine gold medals.

Current roster

2018 FIL World Championship 
The following 23 players made up the roster at the 2018 World Lacrosse Championship.

References 

National lacrosse teams
Lacrosse
English lacrosse teams